Goat Horn is a Canadian heavy metal band founded in Pembroke, Ontario in 1999. The band was composed of Jason Decay (vocals / bass), Brandon Wars (guitar) and Steel Rider (drums). Decay, Wars, and Rider had all been in and out of bands on the local scene before forming Goat Horn. What began as a jam of Cathedral and Judas Priest covers quickly developed into a serious project. Their music was influenced by ground-breaking metal bands such as Venom, Raven, Eudoxis (Canadian thrash metal pioneers), and Celtic Frost.

With the release of their 2001 debut, Voyage To Nowhere, Goat Horn became the main focus and priority of each member's musical endeavors. This album was recorded in a one-day session in February 2001. In September 2001, they relocated to Toronto in order to gain more exposure. The majority of 2002 was spent touring Ontario, Quebec and the northern United States.

In December 2002 the band re-entered the studio to prepare their second release. In June 2003, Storming The Gates was released. The band's last studio release was entitled Threatening Force, and it was released in 2005. Goat Horn disbanded in June 2006. Since its break-up, Jason Decay has continued his heavy metal vision with his new band Cauldron, using demos he recorded for Goat Horn's fourth release as the basis of his new band's material. Decay temporarily joined long-time friends in Kïll Cheerleadër and also filled in on bass in Thor. Brandon Wars formed Zuku, with the drummer from Kïll Cheerleadër, Chris Rites. Kïll Cheerleadër finished in 2007.

Discography 
2001 Voyage to Nowhere
2003 Storming the Gates
2005 Threatening Force

References

External links 

 Myspace Goat Horn
Goat Horn at Rockdetector

Articles 
Bottenberg, Rupert (2006) "Horn of plenty: Toronto's Goat Horn keep true-blue heavy metal alive", Montreal Mirror, vol 21 No. 32, 208 Feb 2006
Green, Nick "The Shadow of the Horn", Decibel Magazine

Interviews 
Chan, Nin "Interview with Jason Decay  of the heavy/doom metal band Goat Horn", Diabolical Conquest
Jason Decay interview, Metal Nightmare

Reviews 
Rivadavia, Eduardo "[ Voyage to Nowhere Review]", Allmusic, Macrovision Corporation

Musical groups established in 1999
Musical groups disestablished in 2006
Canadian thrash metal musical groups
Musical groups from Ontario
Pembroke, Ontario
Canadian doom metal musical groups
Canadian heavy metal musical groups
1999 establishments in Ontario
2006 disestablishments in Ontario